The  Reading Viaduct, also called The Rail Park, is a disused elevated rail line in the Callowhill district of Philadelphia that has been partly transformed into a rail trail.

In 2010, the Center City District and a new community organization, Friends of the Rail Park, began to evaluate options to convert the abandoned viaduct into an elevated park.

On October 31, 2016, construction began on the plan's Phase 1, which added a boardwalk, benches, landscaping, and swings along a quarter-mile (400-meter) section of the viaduct from Broad Street to Callowhill Street; it also reinforced the existing 13th street bridge. The Phase 1 section opened to the public on June 14, 2018.

History

The Philadelphia and Reading Terminal Railroad was incorporated on April 13, 1888, leased by the Philadelphia and Reading Railway on May 1, 1891, and soon began construction. The viaduct and terminal opened on January 29, 1893. In 1984, the Reading Terminal closed, and Philadelphia's Center City Commuter Tunnel opened. The trainshed was incorporated into the Pennsylvania Convention Center.

The viaduct was built by the Reading Company as an approach to the new Reading Terminal.

The viaduct heads north from Reading Terminal and at Callowhill Junction, forks, with Ninth Street Branch formally merging with the current SEPTA main line. Except for a gap caused by the construction of the Vine Street Expressway (I-676/US 30), and a few blocks at the north end, the viaduct still exists. At Callowhill Junction, the City Branch turns west to join the former Reading Company main line at Belmont Junction.

Approaches

The main line of the Philadelphia and Reading Railway (originally the Philadelphia and Columbia Railroad and Northern Liberties and Penn Township Railroad) came into Philadelphia on the southwest side of the Schuylkill River and crossed at a point northwest of downtown (this line is now used only by freight). It then passed into a tunnel under Pennsylvania Avenue and turned east just north of Callowhill Street. The original alignment turned south along Broad Street, with a passenger station at Broad and Vine. The line continued east past Broad Street for freight to the Delaware River, using Willow Street.

The passenger station was later moved to half a block east of Broad Street, on the old freight line. The spur from the new viaduct was later built from the line just east of this station.

The other Reading line, originally the Philadelphia, Germantown and Norristown Railroad, and now used for passenger service by SEPTA, ran north on 9th Street from the east-west line on Willow Street. Its passenger station was at Mount Vernon Street, again where the new viaduct merged with the old alignment.

See also
 	
30th Street Station
Chinese Wall
High Line, a converted elevated line in New York City
Bloomingdale Trail, a converted elevated line in Chicago
Dequindre Cut, a converted below-grade line in Detroit

References

External links 

Friends of the Railpark
VIADUCTgreene
Photo Tour: JJ Tiziou, "Philadelphia's Secret Garden", January 8, 2012

Bridges in Philadelphia
Callowhill, Philadelphia
Elevated parks
Landmarks in Philadelphia
Linear parks
Railroad bridges in Pennsylvania
Reading Company lines
Reading Railroad bridges
Urban public parks
Viaducts in the United States